†Archinacelloidea is an extinct superfamily of paleozoic molluscs of uncertain position (Gastropoda or Monoplacophora).

Families 
 † Archinacellidae
 † Archaeopragidae

References 

Prehistoric gastropods
Middle Ordovician first appearances
Late Ordovician extinctions